McIntosh County Courthouse in Ashley, North Dakota was built in 1919, to serve the surrounding county.

It is one of thirteen Beaux Arts Neo-Classical courthouses in North Dakota designed by the architectural firm of Buechner & Orth.

The courthouse was listed on the National Register of Historic Places in 1980.

References

Beaux-Arts architecture in North Dakota
Government buildings completed in 1919
County courthouses in North Dakota
Courthouses on the National Register of Historic Places in North Dakota
National Register of Historic Places in McIntosh County, North Dakota
1919 establishments in North Dakota